The SS Durham Victory was the 19th Victory ship built during World War II under the Emergency Shipbuilding program. The SS Durham Victory was launched by the California Shipbuilding Company on March 30, 1944, and completed on July 5, 1944. The ship’s United States Maritime Commission designation was VC2-S-AP3, hull number 18 (V-19).  SS Durham Victory served in the Pacific Ocean during World War II and was operated by Agwilines Inc.

Victory ships
The 10,500-ton Victory ships were designed to replace the earlier Liberty ships that were used only for WW2. Compared to the Liberty ships, the Victory ships were much faster, significantly larger, and designed to last longer to serve the US Navy after the war. Victory ships also had a thinner stack set farther toward the superstructure, and a long, raised forecastle. Many ships like the SS Durham Victory were sold.

Christening
SS Durham Victory was christened prior to her first launch at the shipyard of the California Shipbuilding Corporation, also known as CalShip, in Wilmington, Los Angeles. The ship was a one of a total 550 Victory Ships, of which Calship delivered 132. Each ship was named after an American city. The SS Durham Victory was commissioned into battle during World War II at the Battle of Leyte from June 1944 to January 1945.

World War II
SS Durham Victory steamed into the Pacific to bring supplies to the Pacific War troops. She  had the dangerous job of transporting 6,000 pounds of ammunition for the Liberation of The Philippines and the Battle of Leyte from April 1st until April 6th, 1945. The SS Durham Victory worked closely with the US Navy ship USS Mazama, which was an ammunition ship.

She loaded the destroyer  with ammunition on October 30, 1944, at San Pedro Bay on the Philippine Islands. She supplied ammo to the light cruiser  on October 25, 1944, near Surigao Strait. SS Durham Victory was key in the support of the invasion of the Philippines.

In 1945, she anchored at the Ulithi atoll and supplied ammunition to a number of ships for the Battle of Leyte and other actions. On August 10th, 1945, SS  Durham Victory supplied the battleship  with 225 rounds of ammo for her 16", 20mm and 40mm guns.

Honors
SS Durham Victory earned two Battle Stars for combat action, one in the Leyte landings from November 23rd, 1944, to November 29th, 1944, and one for action from January 9th, 1945, to January 18th, 1945,  in the Battle of Luzon. Durham Victory used her deck guns to defend herself and other ships from attacks.

Private Cargo Service
In 1946, the SS Durham Victory was sold to the Holland America Line of Rotterdam, and was renamed the SS AVERDIJK in 1954. In 1967, she was sold to Consolidated Mariner S.A of Panama and renamed the MV DOMINA. In 1972, she was taken to Taiwan and scrapped.

See also
List of Victory ships
 Liberty ship
 Type C1 ship
 Type C2 ship
 Type C3 ship

References

Sources
Sawyer, L.A. and W.H. Mitchell. Victory ships and tankers: The history of the ‘Victory’ type cargo ships and of the tankers built in the United States of America during World War II, Cornell Maritime Press, 1974, 0-87033-182-5.
United States Maritime Commission: 
Victory Cargo Ships 

1944 ships
Ships built in Los Angeles
Merchant ships of the United States
Victory ships
World War II merchant ships of the United States